Miedema is a surname. Notable people with the surname include:

Hessel Miedema (1929–2019), Dutch art historian
Lars Miedema (born 2000), Dutch footballer, brother of Vivianne
Vivianne Miedema (born 1996), Dutch footballer

See also
Medema